Meg Miners (born 23 August 1944) is a Rhodesian former swimmer. She competed in two events for Rhodesia at the 1960 Summer Olympics. She was the first woman to represent Rhodesia at the Olympics.

References

1944 births
Living people
Rhodesian female swimmers
Olympic swimmers of Rhodesia
Swimmers at the 1960 Summer Olympics
Sportspeople from Harare
White Rhodesian people